David Edmonds may refer to:

David Edmonds (businessman) (born 1944), British businessman, civil servant and administrator
David Edmonds (cricketer) (1907–1950), New Zealand cricketer
David Edmonds (philosopher) (born 1964), British philosopher